There are at least 24 named lakes and reservoirs in Bradley County, Arkansas.

Lakes
Bend Lake, el.  
Bilbo Lake, el.  
Black Lake, el.  
Black Lake, el.  
Buck Lake, el.  
Eagle Lake, el.  
Frank Lake, el.  
Gar Lake, el.  
Green Lake, el.  
Middle Lake, el.  
Moro Bay, el.  
Mud Lake, el.  
Pereogeethe Lake, el.  
Pine Prairie Bay, el.  
Raymond Lake, el.  
Scott Water, el.  
Straight Lake, el.  
White Oak Lake, el.

Reservoirs
Atkins Pond, el.  
Bradley County Lake, el.  
Fullerton Lake, el.  
Reeps Lake, el.  
Scott Lake, el.  
Warren Country Club Lake, el.

See also
 List of lakes in Arkansas

Notes

Bodies of water of Bradley County, Arkansas
Bradley